Oriol Cortes (born 28 June 1989) is a Spanish footballer.

Career
Cortes began paying college soccer at Lenoir-Rhyne University in 2009. After finishing two years with the Bears, Cortes moved back to Spain, playing with both CE Júpiter and UE Castelldefels. He returned to the United States in 2015, playing with Premier Development League side Cincinnati Dutch Lions.

After trialling with FC Cincinnati, Cortes signed with United Soccer League side Orange County Blues on 19 April 2016.

References

External links
 

1989 births
Living people
Spanish footballers
Spanish expatriate footballers
Expatriate soccer players in the United States
Cincinnati Dutch Lions players
Orange County SC players
USL League Two players
Association football midfielders
USL Championship players